Keong may refer to:

Ng Chin-Keong, Professor of Chinese History at the National University of Singapore until his retirement in 2006
Tan Keong Choon (1916–2015), Chinese industrialist, community leader and philanthropist in Singapore
Chan Sek Keong, SPMP, DUBC, DUT, SC (born 1937), the third Chief Justice of Singapore
Chen Lip Keong, Malaysian businessman
Chow Chee Keong (1948–2018), Malaysian football goalkeeper
Fong Chi Keong (born 1947), member of the Legislative Assembly of Macau and a businessman
Foo Kok Keong KMN AMN BSD (born 1963), former badminton star from Malaysia

Kuok Io Keong (born 1976), race driver
Liew Vui Keong (born 1960), Malaysian politician
Loh Sea Keong, Malaysian professional cyclist who rides for Thailand Continental Cycling Team
Mah Siew Keong (born 1961), Malaysian politician
Matilda Lo Keong (1856–1915), New Zealand storekeeper, homemaker and community worker
Ooi Shee Keong, Malaysian footballer who last played for T-Team
Wee Choo Keong (born 1953), Malaysian politician
Dai-Keong Lee (1915–2005), American composer
Chan Nai-keong, CBE, JP (1931–2003), Hong Kong engineer and government official
Tan Keong Saik (1850–1909), Singaporean businessman
Keong Sim, Korean-American actor
Su Keong Siong, known as Thomas Su, Malaysian lawyer and politician of Chinese descent
Ryu Tae-keong (born 1961), South Korean sprinter
Chai Keong Toh, Singapore-born computer scientist, engineer, professor, and chief technology officer

See also
Keong Emas (Golden Snail), a popular Javanese folklore about a princess in a golden snail shell
Kheng Hock Keong, the largest and oldest temple to the Chinese sea-goddess Mazu in Yangon, Burma
Keong Saik Road, a one-way road located in Chinatown within the Outram Planning Area in Singapore
Kong Hock Keong Temple (Goddess of Mercy Temple), Taoist temple in George Town, Penang, Malaysia
Kelong
Kenong
Kepong